Tomažja Vas is a small village in the Municipality of Škocjan in southeastern Slovenia. Withion the municipality, it is the administrative centre of the Village Community of Dobrava pri Škocjanu and Tomažja Vas. The area is part of the historical region of Lower Carniola. The municipality is now included in the Southeast Slovenia Statistical Region. 

The local church is dedicated to Saint Stephen and belongs to the Parish of Bela Cerkev. It was first mentioned in written documents dating to 1526 and was restyled in the Baroque in the 18th century.

References

External links
Tomažja Vas at Geopedia

Populated places in the Municipality of Škocjan